Bergler is a surname. Notable people with the surname include:
 Edmund Bergler (1899–1962), Austrian-American psychoanalyst
 Joseph Bergler (1753–1829), Austrian painter and engraver
 Stephan Bergler ( – 1738), German classical scholar and antiquarian

See also 
 Bergel
 Bergner

German-language surnames